Charlotte Amalie Harbor Seaplane Base , also known as St. Thomas Seaplane Base, is located in the harbor by Charlotte Amalie, Saint Thomas, U.S. Virgin Islands. This private-use airport is owned by the Virgin Islands Port Authority.

As per Federal Aviation Administration records, this seaplane base had 76,820 passenger boardings (enplanements) in calendar year 2004 and 71,555 enplanements in 2005.

Facilities 

 Runway E/W: , surface: water
 Runway N/S: , surface: water

Airlines and destinations

Historical air service

Historically, Virgin Islands Seaplane Shuttle operated scheduled passenger service during the 1980s from the Charlotte Amalie seaplane base with Grumman Mallard aircraft. These Grumman amphibious aircraft were powered either by piston engines or by turboprop engines via a powerplant conversion program. During the 1970s,  Antilles Air Boats operated several different types of seaplanes in scheduled passenger service from the harbor as well including the Consolidated PBY Catalina (Super Catalina version), Grumman Goose, Grumman Mallard, Short Sandringham S-25 and Vought Sikorsky VS-44.

Renaming the seaplane terminal 
The terminal was named the Charles F. Blair, Jr. terminal in honor of Charles F. Blair, Jr., an aviation pioneer and the founder of the seaplane airline, Antilles Air Boats.

References

External links 

Airports in the United States Virgin Islands
Seaplane bases in the United States
Charlotte Amalie, U.S. Virgin Islands